The DAF-3 or Dwarfin sma is a nematode Caenorhabditis elegans gene encoding a Co-SMAD protein of TGF-beta signaling pathway. Without daf-7 signal, DAF-3 combined with transcription factor daf-5 to form a heterodimer and started dauer development. When daf-7 binds to the receptors daf-1/daf-4, the phosphorylated daf-8/daf-14 heterodimer enter to the nucleus to inhibit this transcription.

References 

Caenorhabditis elegans genes